Gass is a village in Vasai Taluka, near Mumbai in the Maharashtra state of India. In addition to its Hindu residents, it has a Roman Catholic population of about 5000 as of the year 2009. It is a natural village with a big lake. It is home to salt farming, and is popular for green vegetables farming.

It is known to be a well educated village with a great GDP.

References
Gass Memorial Center, Raipur

Villages in Thane district